Viral hemorrhagic fevers (VHFs) are a diverse group of animal and human illnesses in which fever and hemorrhage are caused by a viral infection. VHFs may be caused by five distinct families of RNA viruses: the families Filoviridae, Flaviviridae, Rhabdoviridae, and several member families of the Bunyavirales order such as Arenaviridae, and Hantaviridae. All types of VHF are characterized by fever and bleeding disorders and all can progress to high fever, shock and death in many cases. Some of the VHF agents cause relatively mild illnesses, such as the Scandinavian nephropathia epidemica (a hantavirus), while others, such as Ebola virus, can cause severe, life-threatening disease.

Signs and symptoms
Signs and symptoms of VHFs include (by definition) fever and bleeding:
 Flushing of the face and chest, small red or purple spots (petechiae), bleeding, swelling caused by edema, low blood pressure (hypotension), and circulatory shock.
 Malaise, muscle pain, headache, vomiting, and diarrhea occur frequently.

The severity of symptoms varies with the type of virus. The "VHF syndrome" (capillary leak, bleeding diathesis, and circulatory compromise leading to shock) appears in a majority of people with filoviral hemorrhagic fevers (e.g., Ebola and Marburg virus), Crimean–Congo hemorrhagic fever (CCHF), and the South American hemorrhagic fevers caused by arenaviruses, but only in a small minority of patients with dengue or Rift Valley fever.

Causes
Five families of RNA viruses have been recognised as being able to cause hemorrhagic fevers.
 The order Bunyavirales includes the families Arenaviridae, Fimoviridae, and all members of the former family Bunyaviridae, especially Peribunyaviridae.
 The family Arenaviridae include the viruses responsible for Lassa fever (Lassa virus), Lujo virus, Argentine (Junin virus), Bolivian (Machupo virus), Brazilian (Sabiá virus), Chapare hemorrhagic fever (Chapare virus), Venezuelan (Guanarito virus) and Whitewater Arroyo virus hemorrhagic fevers.
 The former family Bunyaviridae includes
 the causative agents of Hantavirus hemorrhagic fever with renal syndrome (HV-HFRS) (Hantaviridae),
 the Crimean-Congo hemorrhagic fever (CCHF) virus from the genus Orthonairovirus (Nairoviridae),
 Garissa virus and Ilesha virus from the genus Orthobunyavirus (Peribunyaviridae), and
 the Rift Valley fever (RVF) virus from the genus Phlebovirus (Phenuiviridae).
 The family Filoviridae (order Mononegavirales) includes Ebola virus and Marburg virus.
 The family Flaviviridae (order Amarillovirales) includes dengue, yellow fever, and two viruses in the tick-borne encephalitis group that cause VHF: Omsk hemorrhagic fever virus and Kyasanur Forest disease virus.
 The family Togaviridae (order Martellivirales) includes Chikungunya virus which causes Chikungunya fever.
 Family Rhabdoviridae (order Mononegavirales): In September 2012 scientists writing in the journal PLOS Pathogens reported the isolation of a member of the Rhabdoviridae responsible for 2 fatal and 2 non-fatal cases of hemorrhagic fever in the Bas-Congo district of the Democratic Republic of Congo. The virus was named Bas-Congo virus. The non-fatal cases occurred in healthcare workers involved in the treatment of the other two, suggesting the possibility of person-to-person transmission. This virus is related to the Ephemerovirus and Tibrovirus genera.

The pathogen that caused the cocoliztli epidemics in Mexico of 1545 and 1576 is still unknown, and the 1545 epidemic may have been bacterial rather than viral.

Pathophysiology
Different hemorrhagic fever viruses act on the body in different ways, resulting in different symptoms. In most VHFs, it is likely that several mechanisms contribute to symptoms, including liver damage, disseminated intravascular coagulation (DIC), and bone marrow dysfunction. In DIC, small blood clots form in blood vessels throughout the body, removing platelets necessary for clotting from the bloodstream and reducing clotting ability. DIC is thought to cause bleeding in Rift Valley, Marburg, and Ebola fevers. For filoviral hemorrhagic fevers, there are four general mechanisms of pathogenesis. The first mechanism is dissemination of virus due to suppressed responses by macrophages and dendritic cell (antigen presenting cells). The second mechanism is prevention of antigen specific immune response. The third mechanism is apoptosis of lymphocytes. The fourth mechanism is when infected macrophages interact with toxic cytokines, leading to diapedesis and coagulation deficiency. From the vascular perspective, the virus will infect vascular endothelial cells, leading to the reorganization of the VE-cadherin catenin complex (a protein important in cell adhesion). This reorganization creates intercellular gaps in endothelial cells. The gaps lead to increased endothelial permeability and allow blood to escape from the vascular circulatory system.

The reasons for variation among patients infected with the same virus are unknown but stem from a complex system of virus-host interactions. Dengue fever becomes more virulent during a second infection by means of antibody-dependent enhancement. After the first infection, macrophages display antibodies on their cell membranes specific to the dengue virus. By attaching to these antibodies, dengue viruses from a second infection are better able to infect the macrophages, thus reducing the immune system's ability to fight off infection.

Diagnosis
Definitive diagnosis is usually made at a reference laboratory with advanced biocontainment capabilities. The findings of laboratory investigation vary somewhat between the viruses but in general, there is a decrease in the total white cell count (particularly the lymphocytes), a decrease in the platelet count, an increase in the blood serum liver enzymes, and reduced blood clotting ability measured as an increase in both the prothrombin (PT) and activated partial thromboplastin times (PTT). The hematocrit may be elevated. The serum urea and creatine may be raised but this is dependent on the hydration status of the patient. The bleeding time tends to be prolonged.

Prevention

With the exception of yellow fever vaccine and Ebola vaccines, vaccines for VHF-associated viruses are generally not available. Post-exposure prophylactic (preventive) ribavirin may be effective for some bunyavirus and arenavirus infections.

VHF isolation guidelines dictate that all VHF patients (with the exception of dengue patients) should be cared for using strict contact precautions, including hand hygiene, double gloves, gowns, shoe and leg coverings, and face shield or goggles. Lassa, CCHF, Ebola, and Marburg viruses may be particularly prone to nosocomial (hospital-based) spread. Airborne precautions should be utilized including, at a minimum, a fit-tested, HEPA filter-equipped respirator (such as an N-95 mask), a battery-powered, air-purifying respirator, or a positive pressure supplied air respirator to be worn by personnel coming within 1,8 meter (six feet) of a VHF patient. Groups of patients should be cohorted (sequestered) to a separate building or a ward with an isolated air-handling system. Environmental decontamination is typically accomplished with hypochlorite (e.g. bleach) or phenolic disinfectants.

Management
Medical management of VHF patients may require intensive supportive care. Antiviral therapy with intravenous ribavirin may be useful in Bunyaviridae and Arenaviridae infections (specifically Lassa fever, RVF, CCHF, and HFRS due to Old World Hantavirus infection) and can be used only under an experimental protocol as IND approved by the U.S. Food and Drug Administration (FDA). Interferon may be effective in Argentine or Bolivian hemorrhagic fevers (also available only as IND).

Epidemiology
 Cocoliztli in Mexico 1545 and 1576.
 The Great Yellow Fever Epidemic of 1793 in Philadelphia, PA, US. Nearly 10% of the population of 50,000 died from the disease.
 Mékambo in Gabon is the site of several outbreaks of Ebola virus disease.
 Orientale Province, Democratic Republic of the Congo villages of Durba and Watsa were the epicenter of the 1998–2000 outbreak of Marburg virus disease.
 Uíge Province in Angola was the site of another outbreak of Marburg virus disease in 2005, the largest one to date of this disease.
 A VHF outbreak in the village of Mweka, Democratic Republic of the Congo (DRC) that started in August 2007, and that has killed 103 people (100 adults and three children), has been shown to be caused (at least partially) by Ebola virus.
 A viral hemorrhagic fever is a possible cause of the Plague of Athens during the Peloponnesian War.
 A viral hemorrhagic fever is an alternate theory of the cause of the Black Death and the Plague of Justinian
 The initial, and currently only, outbreak of Lujo virus in September–October 2008 left 4/5 patients dead.
 The 2014 West Africa Ebola outbreak, which was the biggest outbreak in history.

Biowarfare potential
The VHF viruses are spread in a variety of ways. Some may be transmitted to humans through a respiratory route. According to Soviet defector Ken Alibek, Soviet scientists concluded China may have tried to weaponize a VHF virus during the late 1980s but discontinued to do so after an outbreak. The virus is considered by military medical planners to have a potential for aerosol dissemination, weaponization, or likelihood for confusion with similar agents that might be weaponized.

See also

 Dr. Matthew Lukwiya (1957–2000)
 C. J. Peters
 Biosafety
 Jordi Casals-Ariet

References

External links 
 
 
 

 
Animal viral diseases
Tropical diseases